Judgment Day is another name for the Last Judgment in the Abrahamic religions of Judaism, Christianity, and Islam

Judgment Day or Judgement Day may also refer to:

Film and television
Judgement Day (1949 film), a 1949 Czechoslovak comedy film
Judgement Day (1988 film), a 1988 American horror film
Judgment Day: The John List Story, a 1993 American made-for-television film
Judgment Day (1999 film), a 1999 American direct-to-video science-fiction action film
Judgement Day (2013 film), a 2013 Singaporean comedy-drama disaster film
Yomeddine, also known as Judgement Day, a 2018 Egyptian drama film
Judgment Day (Terminator franchise), a date in the Terminator science fiction franchise
Terminator 2: Judgment Day, the second Terminator movie released in 1991
"Judgment Day", a season four episode of the television series Highlander: The Series, aired in 1996
WWE Judgment Day, an annual pay-per-view event held by World Wrestling Entertainment from 1998 to 2009
"Judgment Day", an episode of The New Batman Adventures, aired in 1998
"Judgment Day" (The Outer Limits), the sixth-season premiere episode of The Outer Limits, aired in 2000
"Judgement Day", an episode of the TV series Midsomer Murders, aired in 2000
Reviews on the Run, a Canadian video game review show formerly known as Judgment Day in the U.S., which began airing in 2002
Judgement Day (TV series), a short-lived UK game show, which aired in 2003
Judgment Day: Intelligent Design on Trial, a 2007 Nova documentary on intelligent design
"Judgment Day" (NCIS), the fifth-season finale of the television series NCIS, aired in 2008

Literature
Judgment Day (comics), a number of comic book series or stories
"Judgment Day" (short story), a science fiction story by L. Sprague de Camp
"Judgement Day" (short story), a Southern Gothic story by Flannery O'Connor
Judgment Day, a novel by Penelope Lively
Judgment Day, a 1999 novel by Jane Jensen (originally titled Millennium Rising)
Judgment Day: My Years with Ayn Rand, a memoir by Nathaniel Branden
Judgment Day (novel), by James T. Farrell, the conclusion to his Studs Lonigan trilogy

Music
 Der Tag des Gerichts (1762), oratorio by Telemann
 Judgement Day (band), American String Metal band

Albums
 Judgement Day (album), a 1992 album by Esham
 Judgement Day (Lovebites album), a 2023 album by Lovebites
 Judgement Day, a 2000 album by Balzac (band)
 Judgement Day, a 1993 album by Pooh-Man
 Judgement Day, a 1997 album by Sinner (band)
 Judgement Days, a 2005 album by Ms. Dynamite
Tical 2000: Judgement Day, a 1998 album by Method Man

Songs
 Judgement Day (Laurel Aitken song), 1960 single
 Judgement Day (Method Man song), a 1998 song by Method Man
 "Judgement Day" (Ms. Dynamite song), a 2005 song by Ms. Dynamite
 "Judgment Day", a 1989 song by Whitesnake
 "Judgement Day", a 1991 song by Van Halen
 "Judgement Day", a 2008 song by Dokken
 "Judgement Day", a 2017 song by DragonForce
 "Judgement Day", a 2023 song by Lovebites

Other
Judgment Day, a play by Elmer Rice
Judgement Day (rugby union), an annual Welsh rugby union event
 The Judgment Day, a professional wrestling stable composed of Finn Bálor, Damian Priest, Rhea Ripley and Dominik Mysterio

See also
Judgment (disambiguation)